The Men's College building is a mansion in the historical center of Kamensk-Uralsky, Sverdlovsk oblast.

The building was granted the status of regional significance on the 28th of December 2001 (the Sverdlovsk oblast Government Decree № 859). The object number of cultural heritage of regional significance is 661710946880005.

Architecture 
The mansion was built in the middle of the 19th century. There is no data about the author of the construction project. So-called "exemplary facades" are typical for buildings of Russian cities the first half of the 19th century. 

The one-story mansion is on a corner of Lenin Street (former Bolshaya Moskovskaya) and Communisticheskoy molodeji. The house has a square form. 

The southern facade faces Lenin Street. It is divided into five window axes. The windows of the basement are rectangular with no window surroundings. The windows of the second floor are semicircular in the upper part. They organise a simple metric line in the frame a profiled archivolt. The space under the windows is decorated with rectangular raised panels as the space between windows. 

The eastern façade faces Communisticheskoy molodeji Street. There is also the main entrance to the building. A tall wooden porch with a wooden fence and a wooden visor on the supports leads to the building. On the western facade the composition of the windows is changed and they are arranged in pairs. The decoration is the same as in the facades. The facade served as a firewall therefore it is a blank form wall.

References

Literature 
 
 Памятники архитектуры Каменска-Уральского / С. И. Гаврилова, Л. В. Зенкова, А. В. Кузнецова, А. Ю. Лесунова — Екатеринбург: Банк культурной информации, 2008. — 92 с.

Tourist attractions in Sverdlovsk Oblast
Buildings and structures in Kamensk-Uralsky
Cultural heritage monuments in Kamensk-Uralsky
Cultural heritage monuments of regional significance in Sverdlovsk Oblast